Bullet Train for Australia was an Australian political party, registered from 2013 to 2017. It was a single-issue party campaigning for a fast implementation of high-speed rail. It advocated that the first stage of the bullet train should run from Melbourne to Newcastle via Canberra and Sydney, and be built within 5 years.

The party grew out of the Bullet Train for Canberra party led by Tim Bohm, which at the 2012 ACT elections gained around 9,000 votes, representing 4% of first preference votes.
The party had 18 candidates in the 2013 federal election, in the ACT, NSW and Victoria.

The party was involved in Glenn Druery's Minor Party Alliance.

The Bullet Train For Australia party fielded four candidates for seats in the House of Representatives in the ACT, NSW and Victoria in the 2016 federal election.

On 23 May 2017, the Australian Electoral Commission approved the party's application for voluntary deregistration.

References

External links

Official website

Defunct political parties in Australia
Political parties established in 2013
Political parties disestablished in 2017
2013 establishments in Australia
2017 disestablishments in Australia
Single-issue political parties
Single-issue political parties in Australia
High-speed rail in Australia